Moisey Alexandrovich Markov (13 May 1908 Rasskazovo, Tambov Governorate, Russian Empire - 1 November 1994, Moscow, Russia) was a Soviet physicist-theorist who mostly worked in the area of quantum mechanics, nuclear physics and particle physics. He is particularly known for having proposed the idea of underwater neutrino telescopes in 1960 that was originally developed in the master thesis of his student Igor Mikhailovich Zheleznykh.

Moisey Markov graduated from the Faculty of Physics of Moscow University in 1930. He worked at the Institute of Red Professors (1931-1933) and the Faculty of Physics of the Moscow State University (1933-1934). Since 1934 he worked for the Lebedev Physical Institute. In 1956-1962 he was the head of the Neutrino Physics Laboratory of the Institute for Nuclear Research.

Markov was a full member of the Soviet Academy of Sciences since 1966 (a corresponding member since 1953). In 1968-1988 he was the Secretary of the Department for Nuclear Physics of the Soviet Academy of Sciences. Markov was awarded Hero of Socialist Labor title and three Orders of Lenin. He died in 1994, 3 years after the dissolution of the Soviet Union.

References

1908 births
1994 deaths
People from Rasskazovo
People from Tambovsky Uyezd
Soviet nuclear physicists
Russian nuclear physicists
Moscow State University alumni
Academic staff of Moscow State University
Full Members of the USSR Academy of Sciences
Full Members of the Russian Academy of Sciences
Heroes of Socialist Labour
Recipients of the Order of Lenin